Qaleh Rural District is a rural district (dehestan) in the Central District of Manujan County, Kerman Province, Iran. At the 2006 census, its population was 21,981, in 4,387 families. The rural district has 64 villages.

References 

Rural Districts of Kerman Province
Manujan County